= Govankoppa =

- Village
- Country: India
- State: Karnataka
- District: Dharwad

Government
  - Type: Panchayat raj
  - Body: Gram panchayat

Population (2011)
  - Total: 1,436

Languages
  - Official: Kannada
- Time zone: UTC+5:30 (IST)
- ISO 3166 code: IN-KA
- Vehicle registration: KA
- Website: karnataka.gov.in

Govankoppa is a village in Dharwad district of Karnataka, India. It is situated 8km away from Dharwad, which is both district & sub-district headquarter of Govankoppa village.

== Demographics ==
As of the 2011 Census of India there were 293 households in Govankoppa and a total population of 1,436 consisting of 742 males and 694 females. There were 194 children ages 0-6.
